Bifidobacterium ruminantium is a bacterium found in bovine rumens.

References

Further reading

External links

LPSN
Type strain of Bifidobacterium ruminantium at BacDive -  the Bacterial Diversity Metadatabase

Bifidobacteriales
Bacteria described in 1991